Northern American may refer to:
 an attribute of Northern America, the northerly region of the Americas
 Northern American English, a variant of English in North America

See also 
 North American (disambiguation)
 North America